Mark Brandenburg may refer to:

Mark Brandenburg (baseball) (born 1970), American baseball pitcher
Mark Brandenburg (politician) (born 1955), American politician in Iowa

See also
Gau March of Brandenburg (German: Mark Brandenburg), a district within the Free State of Prussia under Nazi Germany
Margraviate of Brandenburg (German: Markgrafschaft Brandenburg), a major principality of the Holy Roman Empire
Brandenburg (surname)

Brandenburg, Mark